This is a list of Syrian films.

22

1970s

1971
 A Woman of Fire

1973
 The Dupes (Tewfik Saleh)
Memory of a Night of Love
 Wajh Akhar Lil Hub (Muhammad Shahin)

1974
 Al-Mughamara (Muhammad Shahin)
 Everyday Life in a Syrian Village (Omar Amiralay)

1975
 Kafr kasem (Borhane Alaouié)

1980s
 Dreams of the City (Mohamed Malas)

1981
 Hadithat el-Nosf Metr (The Half-Meter Incident) (Samir Zikra)

1983
 Ahlam al-Madina (Mohamed Malas)

1986
 Al-Shams Fi Yawam Gha'em (Muhammad Shahin)
 Waqae‘h al-‘Am al-Muqbel (Chronicles of the Coming Year) (Samir Zikra)

1987
Al-Manam (Mohammad Malas)

1988
Layali Ibn Awa (Abdellatif Abdelhamid)

1990s

1992
 Al-Lail (Mohamed Malas)

1993
 Al-Kompars (Nabil Maleh)

1996
 On a Day of Ordinary Violence, My Friend Michel Seurat... (Omar Amiralay)

1997
 There Are So Many Things Still to Say (Omar Amiralay)
 A Plate of Sardines (Omar Amiralay)

1998
 Nassim al-Roh (Abdellatif Abdelhamid)
 Turab al-Ghuraba’ (Land for A Stranger) (Samir Zikra)

1999
 A1 (Muhammad Ali Adeeb)

2000s

2000
 The Man With Golden Soles (Omar Amiralay)

2001
 Ahla Al- Ayam (Muhammad Ali Adeeb)
 Qamaran wa Zaytouna (Abdellatif Abdelhamid)
 The Jar: A Tale From the East (Ammar Al Sharbaji

2002
 The Box of Life (Usama Muhammad)

2003
 A Flood in Baath Country (Omar Amiralay)

2005
 Bab al-Makam (Mohamed Malas)
 Before Vanishing (Joude Gorani)
 'Alaqat ‘Aamah (Public Relations) (Samir Zikra)

2008
 Dolls - A Woman from Damascus (Diana El Jeiroudi)
 Hassiba (Raymond Boutros)

2010s

2010
 Damascus with Love (Mohamad Abdulaziz)
 September Rain (Abdullatif Abulhamid)
 Apricots (Amar Chebib)
 Damascus Roof and Tales of Paradise (Soudade Kaadan)

2013
 King of the Sands (Najdat Anzour)
 Ladder to Damascus (Mohammad Malas)
 The Return to Homs (Talal Derki)

2014
See List of Syrian films of 2014.

2016
 Little Gandhi

2017 
 Last Men in Aleppo

2019
The Cave

2020s

See also
 Cinema of the world

References

External links
 Syrian films at the Internet Movie Database

Syria
 
Films